Rita Mount (7 February 1885 Montreal – 22 January 1967 in Montreal) was a Canadian painter.

Biography 
Rita Mount was born in Montreal in 1885. Her cousin was  son of Mélaine Delfausse and Josephine Mount, 16 years older than her. At the turn of the century, he was sufficiently known to establish in Montreal the Canadian Society of portraits and paintings. At the age of ten Rita Mount began her artistic studies. She was trained in drawing, workshop and motif, by her cousin who taught several students at the time, including  and Narcisse Poirier. She distinguished herself during the summer classes offered by Maurice Cullen and won a two-year scholarship at the Art Association of Montreal, a private school and museum founded in 1860. Her classical training was complemented by studies and emancipatory stays abroad.

In 1910, at the age 25, Rita Mount studied at the Atelier Delécluze and at the International Circle of Fine Arts in Paris and at the Art Students League in New York with Frank DuMond (1865-1951). She also took landscape painting classes with John F. Carlson in Woodstock, New York. After graduating, she returned to Canada and opened a studio in Montreal.

In search of inspiring landscapes, she travelled, exploring towards the Pacific Coast (Banff in 1934, Victoria, Yellowstone Park and Wyoming in 1937) and then on the Atlantic side (Cape Breton, Nova Scotia, but also Gaspésie in which it stays several times). She gained notoriety for her marine paintings which were the subject of a solo exhibition at the Art Association in 1934.

She is an associate member of the Royal Canadian Academy of Arts and the Independent Art Association.

Residing with her sister Marie Mount on Outremont Avenue, she died on 22 January 1967 at the Montreal General Hospital after a short illness. She is buried at the Côte-des-Neiges Cemetery in Montreal.

Exhibitions 
At the age of 18, she regularly exhibited at the salons of the Art Association of Montreal and, beginning in 1910, at the Royal Canadian Academy of Arts. In 1916-1917, she presented her works at the Bibliothèque Saint-Sulpice, with Claire Fauteux and Berthe Lemoine.

Legacy 
The works of Rita Mount are in the collections of the Montreal Museum of Fine Arts, the Musée national des beaux-arts du Québec and the National Gallery of Canada. At her death in 1967, her sister entrusted her archives to the Bibliothèque nationale du Québec. This material, which also includes correspondence, is one of the few collections illustrating the career of a female artist-painter in Quebec.

References

External links 
 
https://www.klinkhoff.ca/artists/193-rita-mount%2C-a.r.c.a./

1885 births
1967 deaths
20th-century Canadian women artists
20th-century Canadian painters
Artists from  Montreal
Canadian painters
Canadian women painters